Abdisalam Aato (born 1976) is a Somali-American film director, producer, entrepreneur and media consultant. He is the founder of Olol Films, a production company at the forefront of the Somaliwood movement within the Somali film industry.

Personal life
Aato was born in the '70s in Mogadishu, the capital of Somalia. He comes from the Leelkase Tanade a subclan of Daarood., a sub-clan of the Darod clan. After the civil war broke out in the early 1990s, he fled to Kenya in 1993, where he lived in a refugee camp near Mombasa for over three years.

In 1996, Aato traveled to the United States at the invitation of his brother. He initially resettled in Atlanta, Georgia with his entire family, prior to his father's death. In 2001, he relocated to Columbus, Ohio, a prominent center for the Somali diaspora, where he is currently based.

Aato is married. He describes his wife as his driving inspiration.

Career
While in Georgia, Aato began his professional career as a broadcaster and radio announcer at a community television station, Media One. He would write screenplays a minute at a time, subsequently moving on to scripting full-length feature films. With his experience learning film production at Media One, Aato later founded Olol Films, a Columbus-based production company that is at the forefront of the Somaliwood movement within the Somali film industry.

In 2003, he released Rajo ("Hope"), his first feature-length Somali film. It is a semi-autobiographical action drama about a young Somali refugee. The movie was a relatively large production, with a helicopter and luxury vehicles hired for the purpose. It premiered to full houses on Thanksgiving at Studio 35 and a Minneapolis theater. It is It has since become recognized as the first film in the Somaliwood movement and made Columbus the center of Somali diasporic film production. The film marked the beginning of a new wave of Somali films in the 2000s; these films were written, directed and produced by Somali emigres outside Somalia.

As of 2007, Aato has produced, written and directed nine feature films and documentaries in his Cleveland Avenue studio. Two other productions were also in development. He works closely with his wife on all of his film projects, wherein she provides consultation and advice on areas in need of improvement.

Additionally, Aato launched Bartamaha, a multimedia website dedicated to Somali music, short films, news and culture. He likewise hosts the weekly television and online program the Wargelin Show, which focuses on Somali politics and society. As of 2013, Aato also serves as a Senior Media Advisor to the Federal Government of Somalia.

Filmography
Rajo (2003)
Xaaskayga Araweelo (2006)
Ambad (2011)

See also
Ali Said Hassan
Idil Ibrahim
Cinema of Somalia

References

1970s births
Living people
Ethnic Somali people
Somalian emigrants to the United States
Somalian film directors
Somalian film producers
American film producers
People from Mogadishu
African-American Muslims
African-American film directors
21st-century African-American people
20th-century African-American people